Ayad Lamdassem El Mouhcine (born 11 October 1981) is a Moroccan-born long distance runner who competes for Spain internationally. He has represented Spain twice in the 10,000 metres at the Summer Olympics (2008 and 2012) as well as the European Athletics Championships (2010, 2012).

Lamdassem has competed at the IAAF World Cross Country Championships on five occasions (once for Morocco and four times for Spain). He was the silver medallist at the European Cross Country Championships in 2010 and 2011. He was also a gold medallist at the 2010 Ibero-American Championships in Athletics. At the 2020 Valencia Marathon, he set the Spanish national record and earned a spot on the Spanish team for the Tokyo 2020 Olympic marathon, where he finished 5th.

His personal bests include 13:17.49 minutes for the 5000 metres, 27:45.58 min for the 10,000 m, 61:29 for the half marathon and 2:06:25 for the marathon.

Career
He first arrived in Spain in 2002 as part of the Moroccan contingent for the World University Cross Country Championships, which was being held in Santiago de Compostela that year. However, he did not compete and instead deserted the team, using the opportunity to stay on in the country and train with other Moroccans in Valencia. He later moved to Lleida, working with coach Antonio Cánovas, and received citizenship in 2007 after five years of residency.

His first major competition for Spain came the following year in the form of the 2008 Summer Olympics. He ran in the 10,000 m race and finished in 24th place, just behind compatriot Carles Castillejo. He came fourth at the 2008 European Cross Country Championships at the end of the year, helping the Spanish men to the team title. He represented Spain twice at cross country in 2009, coming 30th at the 2009 IAAF World Cross Country Championships and fifth at the 2009 European Cross Country Championships, where Spain retained the team title. He also competed in the 2009 World Championships in Athletics, running in the 10,000 metres, but dropped out mid-race.

He won his first track medal at the 2010 Ibero-American Championships, taking the gold medal in the 5000 metres. At the Great Manchester Run he duelled against Haile Gebrselassie and ended up as runner-up some seven seconds behind the Ethiopian. Lamdassem was selected to run the 10,000 m at the 2010 European Athletics Championships in Barcelona. After leading early on, he eventually slowed on the final lap and missed the medals with a fourth-place finish. He started his 2010/11 cross country season with a third place at the Soria Cross Country in November. At the 2010 European Cross Country Championships he was the first runner to break from the front, although he was caught by Serhiy Lebid and finished as the silver medallist. Lamdassem also led the Spanish men to the bronze in the team competition. He competed at the San Silvestre Vallecana on New Year's Eve and was leading ahead of favourite Zersenay Tadese in the latter stages, but he took a wrong turn on the course, losing his leading margin and eventually finished as runner-up.

A third-place finish at the 2011 Great Edinburgh Cross Country helped the European team to the title. He took the top honours at the Cinque Mulini in February – a performance which lifted his club Bikila Toledo to third for that year's European Cross Country Club Championships, which was held in conjunction with the race. He carried the hopes of the host nation at the 2011 IAAF World Cross Country Championships in Punta Umbría and was the first European to finish, taking 16th place. He won the 2011 Cursa Bombers, although it was a Catalan-only race and his winning time was relatively slow. He missed the track season due to injury and returned in November, coming seventh at the Cross de Atapuerca then second at the Soria race. At the 2011 European Cross Country Championships he was again the runner-up, this time to Atelaw Yeshetela. He was the top European at the Cross de Venta de Baños later that month, coming second to Kenya's Philemon Kimeli. A third place at the San Silvestre Vallecana closed his 2011 season.

Lamdassem returned to the Edinburgh Cross Country in 2012 and won the long race, beating European champion Yeshetela. He won the European Club's Cross Country meet in Castellón, leading Bikila Toledo to the title. He debuted over the marathon distance at the Lake Biwa Marathon but finished 23rd with a relatively slow time of 2:14:39 hours. Returning to shorter distances, he came second to Kenenisa Bekele at the Great Ireland Run and won the Cursa Bombers in April. In June he was a silver medallist at the European Cup 10000m and placed sixth in the event at the 2012 European Athletics Championships. He was selected to run the event for Spain at the 2012 London Olympics, but did not perform as well, coming in 23rd place in 28:49.85 minutes. In his first half marathon in eight years, he came seventh at the Great Scottish Run. A better outing came at the Great South Run 10-miler, where he was runner-up, and near the end of the year he came sixth at the 2012 European Cross Country Championships.

At the start of the 2013 cross country season he made the top two at the Great Edinburgh race and the European Clubs competition.

Achievements

References

External links
 
 
 
 

1981 births
Living people
People from Guelmim-Oued Noun
Spanish male long-distance runners
Moroccan male long-distance runners
Spanish male marathon runners
Moroccan male marathon runners
Athletes (track and field) at the 2008 Summer Olympics
Athletes (track and field) at the 2012 Summer Olympics
Olympic athletes of Spain
Moroccan emigrants to Spain
Naturalised citizens of Spain
Athletes (track and field) at the 2018 Mediterranean Games
Mediterranean Games competitors for Spain
Spanish sportspeople of Moroccan descent
Athletes (track and field) at the 2020 Summer Olympics